Glidden House, at 112 N. E St. in Bridger, Montana, was built during 1906–07.  It was listed on the National Register of Historic Places in 1987.

It was deemed "a distinctive example of Arts and Crafts styling". It was built in 1907 for "Bridger's pre-eminent entrepreneur of the historic period, Samuel Glidden."  It is adjacent to Arts and Crafts-style Corey House which is also National Register-listed.

It has also been known as Pillsbury House, for association with Minneapolis financier Alfred Pillsbury.

See also
Glidden Mercantile, also in Bridger and listed on the National Register

References

Arts and Crafts architecture in the United States
National Register of Historic Places in Carbon County, Montana
Late 19th and Early 20th Century American Movements architecture
Houses completed in 1907
1907 establishments in Montana
Houses on the National Register of Historic Places in Montana
Houses in Carbon County, Montana